Val della Torre is a comune (municipality) in the Metropolitan City of Turin in the Italian region Piedmont, located about  northwest of Turin.

It is situated in the Graian Alps. The Monte Colombano's summit is in the municipal territory.

References

Cities and towns in Piedmont